Douglas Scot Kerns II, also known as Scot Kerns, is a Lutheran theologian and Republican politician who was born in Indianapolis, Indiana. He is the current representative of House District 23 of the Montana State Legislature and a candidate minister in Great Falls, Montana.

Early life
Kerns attained the Eagle Scout award in Boy Scouts.

Education
Kerns attended Randolph-Macon Academy military boarding school in Virginia, then received a BA in Theology from Concordia University Chicago in 2009, and an MA in Divinity from Concordia Theological Seminary in Fort Wayne, Indiana, in 2013.

Career
Kerns has been a guest pastor ten times on KFUO radio. Kerns once served as the "guest chaplain of the day" in the Kansas Senate. He has served as chaplain of the fire department in Vaughn, Montana, and the pastor of a church near Lincoln, Kansas.

Montana State Legislature
During the 2021 legislative session, Kerns served on the Taxation, Education, and Local Government Committees. He sponsored 21 bills, of which three passed:
 LC3090, adding armed service statistics to a suicide-reduction plan
 LC2597, entitling involuntary military enlistees to employment benefits
 LC3107, establishing a fund for the burial of deceased indigent persons

Kerns' 2021 votes were 100% aligned with the recommendations of the Montana Family Foundation and 96% aligned with the recommendations of the Montana Chamber of Commerce.

Personal life
Kerns resides in Great Falls, Montana.

Electoral history

References

External links 

 Scot Kerns at the Montana Legislature website

Politicians from Peoria, Illinois
1986 births
Living people
21st-century Lutherans
Concordia University Chicago alumni
Concordia Theological Seminary alumni
21st-century American politicians
21st-century Lutheran clergy
Republican Party members of the Montana House of Representatives